Ralf-Henrik ”Dave” Lindholm (born 31 March 1952, Helsinki) is a Finnish guitarist and singer-songwriter who has made a career under his own name and also participated in some noteworthy groups. He has written songs and recorded in both Finnish and English.

Lindholm's first recordings were made with his band Ferris that published its sole recording in 1971 through the Love Records label. He wanted to record for Love Records also as a solo artist and suggested that "Great Pen Lee" would be his new stage name. The record label however persuaded him to use the name "Isokynä" (trans. "big pen") and to sing in Finnish or Swedish instead of English. Thus he recorded two albums in Finnish in years 1972 and 1973. Especially the second LP Sirkus, is considered to be one of the most important Finnish rock albums.

In 1975 he established a group that performed in English. He named the group simply the Rock 'n' Roll Band. The band only released one album. In 1978 he released a very successful solo album Vanha ja Uusi Romanssi. He had dropped the name "Isokynä" and was now called simply Dave (pronounced Dá-vé in Finnish slang) Lindholm. In 1979 he formed a rock group called the Bluesounds that also performed in English.  Its most famous album "Black" was released in 1980.

Lindholm has kept on recording and performing his music throughout the years. He has enjoyed relatively little publicity compared to many other long term rock musicians in Finland, but his works are highly respected by Finnish popular music critics and rock/pop music lovers. The most famous songs by Lindholm include "Pieni ja hento ote" (a small slender grip, "Jatsikansa tulee" (the jazz folks are coming), "Sitähän se kaikki on" (that's what it all is), "Kaikki menee seinään" (everything runs into the wall), "Joo, joo, mä rakastan sua" (yes, yes I love you), and "Annan kitaran laulaa vaan" (just let the guitar sing).

Discography

Solo albums
 Iso "Kynä" Lindholm (1972)
 Sirkus (1973)
 Isokynä & Orfeus: Musiikkia (1974)
 Isokynä & Orfeus: Lillan (1974)
 Fandjango (1975)
 Kenen laulu (1977, kokoelma)
 Vanha & uusi romanssi (1979)
 Aino (1982)
 Huoneet 6 & 14 (1983)
 Kuutamolla (1983)
 Moderni hiljainen musiikki (1985)
 Sissi (1987)
 Jose Blues (1988)
 Sillalla (1990)
 Sisar (1991)
 Kerran (1992)
 Kissatanssit (1992)
 LLL (1993)
 Valmista kamaa (1996, kokoelma)
 Just (1998)
 Punainen + (1998)
 Valkoinen & (1999)
 Luuttujengi tulee (2001)
 Lähes 50 (kokoelma, 2002)
 D & D (2006)
 Dave Lindholm in English (2006, live) 
 Nuo mainiot miehet soivine koneineen (with Jarmo Saitajoki) (2007)
 Ken elää, ken näkee. Ken B (2013)
 Ajaton on Ajoissa (2015)

EPs
 Dave Lindholm & Antero Jakoila: Crazy Moon (1980)
 Dave Lindholm & Pepe Ahlqvist: Stunning Episodes (2000) ([Rytmi-lehden kustantama CD)

DVDs
 Dave Lindholm & Henrik Otto Donner: Pieni ja hento ote (2008)

Bands 
 Ferris (1969–1971)
 Isokynä & Orfeus (1973–1974)
 Rock'n'Roll Band (1975)
 Pen Lee (1977–1979) ja Pen Lee & Co. (1975–1976) 
 Bluesounds (1979–1981)
 Sleepy Sleepers
 Pelle Miljoona (1983)
 The Run Runs (1983–1985)
 Dave's 12 Bar (1985–1987)
 Dave Lindholm & White Midnight (1989–1990)
 Leningrad Cowboys
 Dave Lindholm & Canpaza Gypsys (1994–1997)
 Dave Lindholm & Pitkät kiinalaiset (2000)
 SF-Blues (2002)
 Redclouds (2003)
 Dave Lindholm & Jakes Blues Band (2004)
 Messengers (2008-)

References

1952 births
Living people
Musicians from Helsinki
20th-century Finnish male singers
Finnish songwriters
Swedish-speaking Finns
Finnish blues musicians
21st-century Finnish male singers